Emil Brumaru (25 December 1938 – 5 January 2019) was a Romanian writer and poet. He was renowned for his erotic poetry.

Early life 
Born in Bahmutea, Bessarabia, Brumaru studied medicine at the Faculty of Medicine in Iași before turning to poetry in 1975.

Brumaru died on 5 January 2019 in Iași at the age of 80.

Works 

 Versuri (Stanzas), Editura Albatros, Bucharest, 1970
 Detectivul Arthur (Arthur the Detective), Cartea Românească, Bucharest, 1970
 Julien Ospitalierul (Julian the Hospitaller), Cartea Românească, Bucharest, 1974
 Cântece naive (Naive Songs), Cartea Românească, Bucharest,  1976
 Adio, Robinson Crusoe (Adieu, Robinson Crusoe), Cartea Românească, Bucharest, 1978
 Dulapul îndrăgostit (The Enamoured Cupboard), Cartea Românească, Bucharest, 1980
 Ruina unui samovar (The Ruins of a Samovar), Cartea Românească, Bucharest, 1983
 Dintr-o scorbură de morcov (From the Hollow of a Carrot), Editura Nemira, Bucharest 1998
 Poeme alese (Selected Poems), 2003
 Opera poetică (2 vol., 2003, 3 vol., 2006) (Poetic Works), 2 vols., Editura Cartier, Kishinev, 2003, 2nd edition, 3 vols., 2006. 
 Fluturii din pandişpan (Pain d'Espagne Butterflies), Editura Cronica, Iași, 2003
 Poezii (carte la borcan) (Poems. Jarbook), Editura Humanitas, Bucharest, 2003
 Cerşetorul de cafea (The Coffee Scrounger), Editura Polirom, Iași, 2004
 Submarinul erotic (The Erotic Submarine), Cartea Românească, Bucharest, 2005
 Infernala comedie (The Infernal Comedy), Editura Brumar, Timișoara, 2005
 Dumnezeu se uită la noi cu binoclul (God is Gazing at us through Binoculars), Editura Polirom, Iași, 2006
 O brumă de paiete şi confetti (A Frosting of Spangles and Confetti), co-author: Șerban Foarță, 2007
 Cântece de adolescent (An Adolescent's Songs), 2007
 Povestea boiernaşului de ţară şi a fecioarei... (The Story of the Rural Petty Boyar and the Maiden...), Editura Trei, Bucharest, 2008
 Ne logodim cu un inel din iarbă (We Betroth Ourselves with this Ring of Grass), 2008
 Opere I. Julien Ospitalierul (Works I. Julian the Hospitaller), Editura Polirom, Iași, 2009
 Opere II. Submarinul erotic (Works II. Erotic Submarine), Editura Polirom, Iași, 2009
 Rezervația de îngeri (The Angel Reservation), Humanitas, Bucharest, 2013

Presence in anthologies
 Testament – Anthology of Modern Romanian Verse, second edition (bilingual version English/Romanian) – author and translator Daniel Ioniță, with Eva Foster, Rochelle Bews, and Prof.Dr.Daniel Reynaud – Editura Minerva, January 2015. 
 2019 -Testament - 400 Years of Romanian Poetry/400 de ani de poezie românească - Minerva Publishing 2019 - Daniel Ioniță (editor and principal translator) assisted by Daniel Reynaud, Adriana Paul and Eva Foster. 
 2020 - Romanian Poetry from its Origins to the Present - bilingual edition - Daniel Ioniță (editor and principal translator) with Daniel Reynaud, Adriana Paul and Eva Foster - Australian-Romanian Academy Publishing - 2020 -  ;

References

1938 births
2019 deaths
20th-century Romanian poets
Romanian male poets
Romanian erotica writers
20th-century Romanian male writers
21st-century Romanian poets
21st-century male writers